Yeagley is a surname. It may refer to:

David Yeagley (1951–2014), American Comanche, classical composer, conservative political writer and activist
Donald Yeagley (1920-2020), American politician and labor union activist
J. Walter Yeagley (1909–1990), American judge
Jerry Yeagley (born 1940), American soccer player and coach
Susan Yeagley (born 1972), American actress
Todd Yeagley, American soccer player